The Ebenezer Methodist Episcopal Chapel and Cemetery is a historic church located northwest of Golden, Adams County, Illinois. The church was built in 1858–59 for the local Methodist Episcopal congregation. The church has a vernacular Greek Revival design; while the style was common in Illinois before the Civil War, the church is now the only one of its type in the county. The church is a white sided building on a limestone foundation; it is topped by a gable roof with a simple entablature at either end. The church's cemetery, located to the west of the building, has had burials since 1857 and contains both members and non-members of the church.

The church was added to the National Register of Historic Places on June 4, 1984. It is one of two sites on the National Register in Golden, the other being the Exchange Bank.

Notes

External links

 

Buildings and structures in Adams County, Illinois
National Register of Historic Places in Adams County, Illinois
Cemeteries in Illinois
Methodist churches in Illinois
Methodist cemeteries
Churches on the National Register of Historic Places in Illinois